Someday Is Less Than a Second Away is a studio album by Canadian hip hop artist DL Incognito. It was released April 16, 2013 on URBNET Records.

Music 
The album is produced by Techtwelve, Dirty Sample, Gigz The Unknown Producer, Tom Wrecks, Illo and DL Incognito himself. Guest appearances include Adam Bomb, D-Sisive, Geneva B and Caliph.

Track listing

References

External links 
 Someday Is Less Than a Second Away at Bandcamp
 Someday Is Less Than a Second Away at Discogs

2013 albums
DL Incognito albums